CubaDupa is New Zealand's largest outdoor arts and music festival, celebrating the unique character of Cuba Street, Wellington. CubaDupa describes itself as "a creative playground blurring the lines between audience & performer." It attracts up to 100,000 people.
The festival is managed and produced by the non-profit Creative Capital Arts Trust. It is held each year over a weekend (Saturday to Sunday) in late March. The festival features a dozen music stages, parade groups, street theatre performances, visual art installations, and food and beverage vendors. Some central city streets are closed with Cuba Street in the centre, creating a large pedestrian festival zone. Many artists participate in the CubaDupa programme, including acts from all over the world. In 2023, over 1,200 artists were signed up to perform, in 41 different venues around the city centre.

History 
CubaDupa is a revival of the Cuba Street Carnival, which was created and run by Martin Wilson through the 1980-90s.  Two additional privately run carnivals were staged in 1991 and 1993. Chris Morley Hall re-launched the carnival from 1998–2009.

CubaDupa was founded in 2015, from a vision between the newly formed non-profit Creative Capital Arts Trust, and the Wellington City Council. The CCAT is also the umbrella for the New Zealand Fringe Festival.

Team and partners
Drew James is the "founder and creative force" behind CubaDupa. He began as Artistic Director from 2015–2019. In 2020, Gerry Paul took the role of Festival Director, while James assumed the position of CCAT Chief Executive and remained as a creative consultant.  In 2021, James is became Festival Director as well as being CCAT Chief Executive. Bianca Bailey, CubaDupa Festival Producer. Bianca Bailey joined the team in 2020 as CCAT Music and Festival Producer.

Though ran by the CCAT, CubaDupa is financially powered in part by local partners. In 2023, these partners included the Arts Council of NZ Toi Aotearoa/Creative NZ, E Tū Whānau, Wellington City Council, Te Māngai Pāho, the Four Winds Foundation, The Lion Foundation, NZ Community Trust, and Pub Charity Limited.

Most of the workers are at event itself are volunteer, in roles such as event support, zone supervisors, artist minders, greenroom attendants, and parade marshals.

Festivals 

Some of the events of the 2015 festival were 100 Brazilian samba drummers hosted by Wellington Batucada and The Grand Opening tours of the Opera House produced by Barbarian Productions as well as stages with bands. The new brand for CubaDupa was a finalist in the 2015 Designers Institute of New Zealand, Best Design Awards in the Small Brand Identity category.

In 2017, the CubaDupa festival was reported as having 250 events from Samba performances, opera, dance, steampunks, and virtual reality tours and 90 street food stalls.

The 2019 programme included Cha Wa from New Orleans, Alien Weaponry, and New Zealand dance company Touch Compass. The programme and locations were changed to create a more security-focused event after the Christchurch Terror Attacks just prior on 15 March.

The COVID-19 pandemic in New Zealand forced the cancellation of the 2020 festival, with the decision made very close to the event. There were 1500 artists and 450 performances lined up. A live streaming event occurred on Saturday 18 April.

The festival was revived in 2021, after COVID-19 cases had fallen significantly and lockdown restrictions had been lifted. It had over 120,000 attendees on the Saturday alone, surpassing the typical crowd of 100,000 across both days. Reportedly, the Director-General of Health at the time, Ashley Bloomfield, who was heavily involved in the efforts against COVID-19, paid a visit to the event.

In 2022, the festival was again cancelled, just six weeks before the event, due to a spike in COVID-19. They had planned for a "portal-entering" theme, which they postponed to re-use in 2023.

Policies 
Though The Cuba Precinct is a liquor ban zone and CubaDupa is family friendly event, alcohol is available to buy and drink during the festival in designated licensed areas.

The festival is committed to "providing an accessible and welcoming experience for festival-goers with specific requirements or additional needs."

They are also progressing toward being a Zero Waste event, and in 2023 are implementing measures such as being plastic bag free, having dedicated waste and recycling bin stations, requiring compostable packaging from all participating street food stalls, supplying reusable cups to all drink vendors, and collaborating with Native Sparkling to donate toward planting native trees.

References 

Festivals in Wellington
Arts festivals in New Zealand